Terence "Terry" Cook (24 June 1927 – 18 January 2016) was a Welsh dual-code international rugby union, and professional rugby league footballer who played in the 1940s and 1950s.

International honours
Cook won 4 caps for Wales (RU) in 1951–53 while at Cardiff RFC in 1949 against Scotland and Ireland, and won caps for Wales (RL) while at Halifax.

References

External links
cardiffrfc → Pastplayers → C
Statistics at cardiffrfc
(archived by web.archive.org) Obituary: Former Dual-Code Star Terry Cook

1927 births
2016 deaths
Cardiff RFC players
Dual-code rugby internationals
Halifax R.L.F.C. players
Pontypool RFC players
Rugby league players from Caerphilly County Borough
Rugby league wingers
Rugby union players from Bedwas
Rugby union wings
Wales international rugby union players
Wales national rugby league team players
Welsh rugby league players
Welsh rugby union players